Emmanuel Arongo was an Anglican bishop  in Ghana:  he was Bishop of Tamale from 1997 to 2010.

References

Anglican bishops of Tamale
20th-century Anglican bishops in Ghana
21st-century Anglican bishops in Ghana